Friedrich Christian Schrempf (24 February 1858 – 8 January 1913) was an editor and a member of the German Reichstag.

Life
Schrempf was born in Besigheim and was raised by his mother's brother. He attended schools in Ingersheim, Boll and Horrheim. After the aspirant exam in March 1871, he was a student at the private seminar Tempelhof in Oberamt Crailsheim from 1872 to 1875, and then was a seminary teacher there until 1879. After that he was a teacher at the boys' school of Professor Pfleiderer and in the community grammar school in Korntal until 1890. Subsequently, he was a contributing editor of the conservative daily Deutsche Reichspost in Stuttgart, and from spring 1892 to 1909 lead editor. From 1890 he was also secretary of the conservative Württemberg Party. On 1 December 1912, Schrempf retired. He died in Stuttgart.

Politics
Between 1895 and 1900, Schrempf was a member of the Estates of Württemberg for the Schorndorf constituency and from 1906 to 1912 for the Öhringen constituency.

From 1898 to 1903, Schrempf was a member of the German Reichstag for the electoral district of Württemberg 7 (Nagold, Calw, Neuenbürg, Herrenberg). He was nominated as a compromise candidate of the National Liberal Party, the Conservatives and the German Agrarian League. In the Reichstag, he belonged to the faction of the German Conservative Party.

References

This article incorporates information from the corresponding article in the German Wikipedia

1858 births
1912 deaths
People from Besigheim
People from the Kingdom of Württemberg
German Conservative Party politicians
Members of the Reichstag of the German Empire
Members of the Württembergian Chamber of Deputies